The 2006 IIHF World Championship was held in between 5–21 May 2006 in Riga, Latvia. It was the 70th annual event, and was run by the International Ice Hockey Federation (IIHF).

One of the requirements of the IIHF for Latvia to host the event was that a new arena would be constructed. Sweden was the stand-by organizer in case the arena was delayed, but the construction was completed on schedule, marking the first time a former Soviet state apart from Russia has hosted the event. The mascot of the championships was a beaver called RIX (after Riga International Airport's IATA code.)

Sweden shut out the Czech Republic 4-0 in the Gold Medal Game to win the IIHF World Championships. Sweden had won the 2006 Winter Olympic Men's Ice Hockey Gold 3-2 versus Finland in Turin, Italy two months earlier. They therefore became the first hockey team to win both the Winter Olympics and the IIHF World Championships in the same year.

Venues

Nations
The following 16 nations qualified for the elite-pool tournament – 13 nations from Europe, two nations from North America and one nation from Asia are represented.
Asia

Europe

North America

Rosters

Preliminary round 
Sixteen participating teams were placed in the following four groups. After playing a round-robin, the top three teams in each group advanced to the qualifying round. The last team in each group competed in the relegation round.

Groups A and D were played in Kloten, groups B and C in Berne.

Group A 

All times local (UTC +3)

Group B 

All times local (UTC +3)

Group C 

All times local (UTC +3)

Group D 

All times local (UTC +3)

Qualifying round
The top three teams from each group in the preliminary round advance to the qualifying round.  The top three teams from Groups A and D advance to Group E, and the top three teams from Groups B and C advance to Group F.

Teams in the qualifying round carry forward the results and points gained in the preliminary round with the teams that they have played and advance with. Teams, which have played in the preliminary round, do not meet again in the qualifying round.

Group E

All times local (UTC+3)

Group F

All times local (UTC +3)

Relegation round
The relegation round is composed of the four teams that placed last in Groups A through D.  They play in a round-robin fashion, and the bottom two teams get relegated to the Division I group in next year's World Championships.

Group G

All times local (UTC +3)

Playoff round

Bracket

Quarter-finals

Semi-finals

Bronze medal game

Gold medal game

Ranking and statistics

Tournament Awards
Best players selected by the directorate:
Best Goaltender:  Johan Holmqvist
Best Defenceman:  Niklas Kronwall
Best Forward:  Sidney Crosby
Most Valuable Player:  Niklas Kronwall
Media All-Star Team:
Goaltender:  Andrei Mezin
Defence:  Niklas Kronwall,  Petteri Nummelin
Forward:  Sidney Crosby,  Alexander Ovechkin,  David Výborný

Final standings
The final standings of the tournament according to IIHF:

Scoring leaders
List shows the top skaters sorted by points, then goals. If the list exceeds 10 skaters because of a tie in points, all of the tied skaters are left out.
Source: IIHF.com

Leading goaltenders
Only the top five goaltenders, based on save percentage, who have played 40% of their team's minutes are included in this list.
Source: IIHF.com

IIHF broadcasting rights

Austria:
 Austrian Matches: ORF
 Other Matches: ORF Sport Plus
Canada:
 English: TSN
 French: RDS
Czech Republic: Česká televize (ČT2, ČT4 Sport)
Denmark: TV2 Sport
Finland: YLE
France: Sport+
Germany:
 German Matches: ARD, ZDF
 Other Matches: DSF
Latvia: TV3, 3+ Latvia
Norway:
 Norwegian Matches: NRK
 Other Matches: Viasat SportN, Viasat Sport 3
Russia: RTR Sport
Slovakia: STV
Slovenia: RTV Slovenija
Sweden: Viasat
Switzerland:
 German: SF zwei
 French: TSR 2
 Italian: TSI 2
Ukraine: Megasport

See also
2006 in ice hockey
2006 IIHF World U18 Championships
2006 World Junior Ice Hockey Championships

References

External links
2006 IIHF World Championship official site

 
IIHF World Championship
1
Latvian
Sports competitions in Riga
2006
May 2006 sports events in Europe
2000s in Riga
Ice hockey in Riga